The European Academy of Neurology (EAN) is a non-profit organisation that unites and supports neurologists across Europe. Currently, 47 European national neurological societies as well as 2300 individuals are registered members of EAN. Thus, EAN represents more than 45,000 European neurologists.

The EAN was founded during the Joint Congress of European Neurology in June 2014 by the former European Federation of Neurological Societies (EFNS) and European Neurological Society (ENS). The academy's current president is Professor Paul Boon (Ghent, Belgium).

European Academy of Neurology congress 
The EAN organises the annual congress of European neurology, which is held in different European cities and is attended by approximately 6,000 international participants.

2014: EFNS–ENS Joint Congress of European Neurology in Istanbul, Turkey. Birthplace of the European Academy of Neurology.

2015: 1st EAN Congress in Berlin, Germany

2016: 2nd EAN Congress in Copenhagen, Denmark

2017: 3rd EAN Congress in Amsterdam, Netherlands

2018: 4th EAN Congress in Lisbon, Portugal

2019: 5th EAN Congress in Oslo, Norway

2020: 6th EAN Congress in Paris, France

2021: 7th EAN Congress in Vienna, Austria

2022: 8th EAN Congress in Vienna, Austria 

2023: 9th EAN Congress in Budapest, Hungary

2024: 10th EAN Congress in Helsinki, Finland

2025: 11th EAN Congress in Sevilla, Spain

Member societies

Organisation 
The European Academy of Neurology consists of an elected/appointed Board, as well as programme, education, liaison and scientific committees. There are 29 subspecialty scientific panels, each responsible for a specific neurological topic:

Publications 
 EANpages
 Archive of the EFNS
 eBrain
 European Journal of Neurology
 EAN Guideline Papers
 Handbook of Neurological Management Volumes 1 and 2

References

External links 
 Official website of the EAN

International organisations based in Austria
International medical associations of Europe
Neurology organizations